Sandall railway station served the suburb of Kirk Sandall, South Yorkshire, England, from 1857 to 1859 on the Doncaster to Thorne section of the South Yorkshire Railway.

History
The station was opened in April 1857 by the South Yorkshire Railway. It was only open on Saturdays. It was a very short-lived station, only being open for two years before closing in September 1859.

References

Disused railway stations in South Yorkshire
Former South Yorkshire Railway stations
Railway stations in Great Britain opened in 1857
Railway stations in Great Britain closed in 1859
1857 establishments in England
1859 disestablishments in England